St. Mary's Catholic Church is a historic church at 159 Washington Street in Winchester, Massachusetts. The church is part of St Mary's Parish, which includes St Mary's School. Both are part of Roman Catholic Archdiocese of Boston.

Architecture and history
St. Mary's is located at the southeast corner of Washington and Bridge Streets, just northeast of Winchester center. The church building was built in 1876, replacing Winchester's first Roman Catholic place of worship, a chapel built on the same site in 1874. The area at the time was a center of a growing Irish-American population. 

Originally clad in wood, this church underwent major renovations in 1897 under the direction of architect Patrick W. Ford, a noted area designer of churches, at which time it was clad in brick. It resembles older Federal period New England churches, with the nave set parallel to the roof gable. The building is richly decorated, with corbelled cornices and decorative buttresses. The square tower is offset at the northwestern corner, with a Gothic-arched entrance and a belfry with louvered pairs of Gothic-arched openings. A small baptistry and meeting, added c. 1900 to originally house a library, stands just south of the main building. The building was listed on the National Register of Historic Places in 1989, reflecting the church's important role in the local Irish Catholic community.

See also
National Register of Historic Places listings in Winchester, Massachusetts

References

External links
St Mary's Parish
The History of St Mary's Parish

Churches on the National Register of Historic Places in Massachusetts
Churches in Middlesex County, Massachusetts
Buildings and structures in Winchester, Massachusetts
National Register of Historic Places in Winchester, Massachusetts
1876 establishments in Massachusetts